The Sino-American Special Technical Cooperative Organization, also known as the Sino-American Cooperative Organization (SACO), was an organization created by the SACO Treaty signed by China and the United States in 1942 during the Second World War. It established a mutual intelligence gathering entity in China between the respective nations against Japan. It operated in China jointly along with the Office of Strategic Services (OSS), America's first intelligence agency and forerunner of the CIA while also serving as joint training program between the two nations.

History and operations

The first and last operational chief of the organization was Dai Li (Tai Li, Dai/Tai is the surname), head of Chiang Kai-shek's secret police, the Bureau of Investigation and Statistics. A fierce anti-communist and shadowy man of mystery, General Dai also commanded the Loyal Patriotic Army (LPA), a large militia force active in Japanese-occupied interior regions of China. Commander for the American forces was United States Navy Captain Milton E. Miles. "Mary" Miles, later a Vice Admiral, was commander of Naval Group China (NGC), the American Navy's intelligence unit in China during the war.

In April 1943, SACO began setting up camps (later known as units when Naval Group China was established) to train Chinese guerrillas in small arms, demolition, sabotage, combat techniques, radio handling, aircraft and ship recognition, and aerology. Many, if not most, of the American instructors had backgrounds in law enforcement prior to the war. While some of the recruits the Chinese provided were unhealthy to some degree, they surprised their instructors with their willingness and ability to learn.

About 2500 sailors and Marines trained and operated with Chinese guerrilla forces, often behind Japanese lines. Among all the wartime missions that Americans set up in China, SACO was the only one that adopted a policy of "total immersion" with the Chinese. The "Rice Paddy Navy" or "What-the-Hell Gang" operated in the China-Burma-India theatre, advising and training, forecasting weather and scouting landing areas for USN fleet and General Claire Lee Chennault's 14th AF, rescuing downed American flyers, and intercepting Japanese radio traffic. An underlying mission objective during the last year of war was the development and preparation of the China coast for Allied penetration and occupation. Fujian Province was scouted as a potential staging area and springboard for the future invasion of Japan.

In total, the guerrillas trained and supported by SACO/Naval Group China had destroyed more than 200 bridges, 84 locomotives, and 141 ships and river craft. Their activities were responsible for the deaths of around 71,000 Japanese military personnel, and the guerrillas themselves killed about 30,000- a rate of 2 1/2 Japanese for each weapon supplied to the guerrillas by SACO. This "kill ratio" was unmatched by any branch of the American military during the war.  CAPT Miles deputy's estimate of Japanese deaths was a less generous 23,000.

The official SACO organization dissolved in 1946 after the close of the war, with the subsequent departure of the Naval Group China. However some KMT loyal SACO-trained guerillas continued aggression against the CCP during the civil war (1946–1949). SACO arrested, tortured, and killed political dissidents. For a long period after the Communist victory in the Chinese Civil War, SACO became associated with imperial foreign aggression and atrocities of the revolution were attributed to sinister US involvement. The Chinese government memorialized incidents of torture and massacre at Chongqing former SACO HQ at Happy Valley, and displayed the "Gele Mountain Revolution Memorial Museum" in Geleshan, citing American supplied handcuffs and weapons in the exhibition as evidence of American involvement. The coalition was blamed for atrocities committed years after dissolution, with no acknowledgement of SACO's participation in the war against Japan. Only recently has the government taken a position to "restore history's original face."

The 1953 movie Destination Gobi is a highly fictionalized account of one group of weather observers. SACO is specifically mentioned as their parent organization.

See also 

Sino-American Mutual Defense Treaty, during Cold War
United States Taiwan Defense Command
Military Assistance Advisory Group ROC

References

Further references

 Shen Yu, "SACO in History and Histories: Politics and Memory," Journal of American-East Asian Relations 5.1  (1996):  37–76.

External links

 Picture of the SACO Headquarters
 Webpage about SACO
 World War II SACO stories and photos
 SACO photos of CBI theater by SP1CD W.E. Smith
 SACO unofficial website
Milton E. Miles Papers, 1942-2011 (bulk 1942-1946) MS 420 held by Special Collections & Archives, Nimitz Library at the United States Naval Academy

Treaties of the Republic of China (1912–1949)
Treaties of the United States
China–United States military relations
1942 in China
World War II treaties
Treaties concluded in 1942
Military intelligence units and formations of the United States